Viktor Viktorovich Pasichnyk (born December 2, 1992, in Kremenets, Ukraine) is a Ukrainian Nordic combined skier. He participated at the 2014 and 2018 Winter Olympics.

Career
He began to compete at World Cup in 2012-13 season. In his first race in Almaty, Kazakhstan on February 9, 2013, he was 36th. Next day he was 34th. That season was over for him without any World Cup point. In pre-Olympic season he had more World Cup starts. On January 5, 2014, Pasichnyk was 19th in Russian Chaikovskiy which is his best result so far.

Viktor participated at 2014 Winter Olympics in Sochi, Russia. He was 30th in LH competition and 42nd in NH competition.

After 2014 Olympics he didn't actively participate at World Cup having started just in several races. He had good results at Winter Universiades: in 2015 he was 4th in NH competition, and 5th in 2017 in team competition. In 2017-18 season he took part in 5 individual and one team races but didn't manage to earn any point.

Before the 2018 Winter Olympics Viktor set his personal best in the World Cup which was 16th in Val di Fiemme, Italy, on January 13, 2018, and later he repeated this achievement in Hakuba, Japan, on February 3, 2018. He gained Olympic quota for the 2018 Games. In Pyeongchang he finished 30th and 23rd.

Career results

Winter Olympics

World Championships

World Cup

Rankings

References

External links

1992 births
Living people
Ukrainian male Nordic combined skiers
Olympic Nordic combined skiers of Ukraine
Nordic combined skiers at the 2014 Winter Olympics
Nordic combined skiers at the 2018 Winter Olympics
People from Kremenets
Competitors at the 2015 Winter Universiade
Sportspeople from Ternopil Oblast